Startown Liberty is a 1984 role-playing game supplement, written by J. Andrew Keith under the pen-name of John Marshal for Traveller published by Gamelords.

Contents
Startown Liberty is a supplement which provides encounters and events to take place in the area near the starport of a world.

Publication history
Startown Liberty was written by John Marshal, with art by William H. Keith Jr., and was published in 1984 by Gamelords as a digest-sized 48-page book.

Reception
Stephen Nutt reviewed Startown Liberty for Imagine magazine, and stated that "Startown liberty is not a full scenario, it is a play-aid. As such it is really useful to a referee and it can be used over and over again."

Tony Watson reviewed Startown Liberty in The Space Gamer No. 72. Watson commented that "Startown Liberty is a fine way to provide a playing group with diversion, red herrings, or a necessary contact."

Reviews
 Different Worlds #37 (Nov./Dec., 1984)

References

Role-playing game supplements introduced in 1984
Traveller (role-playing game) supplements